Anaxagoras is a young lunar impact crater that is located near the north pole of the Moon. It lies across the larger and more heavily worn crater Goldschmidt. To the south-southeast is Epigenes, and due south is the worn remains of Birmingham.

Anaxagoras is a relatively recent impact crater that is young enough to still possess a ray system that has not been eroded by space weathering. The rays from the site reach a distance of over 900 kilometers from the rim, reaching Plato to the south.  It is consequently mapped as part of the Copernican System.

The crater interior has a relatively high albedo, making it a prominent feature when the Moon is nearly full. (The high latitude of the crater means that the Sun always remains close to the horizon even at maximum elevation less than a day after Full Moon.) The interior walls are steep and possess a system of terraces. The central peak is offset from the crater midpoint, and joins a low range across the crater floor.  In fact, it appears that some of the central peak material has landed outside the crater rim.

Satellite craters
By convention these features are identified on lunar maps by placing the letter on the side of the crater midpoint that is closest to Anaxagoras.

References

External links
 Exposed Fractured Bedrock in the Central Peak of the Anaxagoras Crater, LRO article, 16 April 2010

External links